"Backfire at the Disco" is a single from British indie band, the Wombats. It is from their debut album, The Wombats Proudly Present: A Guide to Love, Loss & Desperation. It was originally released on April 9, 2007, but was re-released on April 21, 2008.

Formats and track listings
Track listings of major single releases of "Backfire at the Disco".

First release

UK CD single
(Released April 9, 2007)
 "Backfire at the Disco"
 "Backfire at the Disco (KGB Remix)

UK 7" single (Gatefold Sleeve, Coloured Vinyl)
(Released April 9, 2007)
 "Backfire at the Disco"
 "Little Miss Pipedream"

UK 7" single (Picture Disc)
(Released April 9, 2007)
 "Backfire at the Disco"
 "Moving to New York (BBC Radio 1 Session)"

Second release

UK CD single
(Released April 21, 2008)
 "Backfire at the Disco"
 "Patience (BBC Radio 1 Live Version)"

UK 7" single (Coloured Vinyl)
(Released April 21, 2008)
 "Backfire at the Disco (Live from The JD Set feat. Peter Hook)"
 "Let’s Dance to Joy Division (Live acoustic version)"

UK 7" single (Picture Disc)
(Released April 21, 2008)
 "Backfire at the Disco (South Central remix)"
 "Caravan in Wales"

Reviews

In reviews, Backfire at the Disco is said to "gnaw itself into your brain like some kind of tropical disease".
It is also said to  be one of "three superb singles in a row from The Wombats".
The video contains a pastiche of the famous derided 1979 video from Cliff Richard "Wired for Sound". This involves people in lurid spandex outfits on roller skates. The Cliff Richard video is currently in the Top 5 Worst Videos ever made on VH1.

Charts

References 

2007 singles
The Wombats songs
2007 songs
14th Floor Records singles
Songs written by Matthew Murphy
Songs written by Dan Haggis
Songs written by Tord Øverland Knudsen